István Schillerwein (13 December 1933 – 19 May 2009) was a Hungarian cyclist. He competed in four events at the 1952 Summer Olympics.

References

1933 births
2009 deaths
Hungarian male cyclists
Olympic cyclists of Hungary
Cyclists at the 1952 Summer Olympics
Cyclists from Budapest